Misano di Gera d'Adda is a comune (municipality) in the Province of Bergamo in the Italian region of Lombardy, located about  east of Milan and about  south of Bergamo.

Misano di Gera d'Adda borders the following municipalities: Calvenzano, Capralba, Caravaggio, Vailate.

Demographic evolution

References